The African Weightlifting Championships is an event organised by Weightlifting Federation of Africa (WFA).

Weights
Athletes compete in a total of 20 weight categories (10 for men and 10 for women) since 2019:
Men categories: 55 kg, 61 kg, 67 kg, 73 kg, 81 kg, 89 kg, 96 kg, 102 kg, 109 kg and +109 kg.
Women categories: 45 kg, 49 kg, 55 kg, 59 kg, 64 kg, 71 kg, 76 kg, 81 kg, 87 kg and +87 kg.

Editions

  Held jointly with the 2011 Commonwealth Championship.
  Held as part of the 2015 African Games.
  Was cancelled because of COVID-19 pandemic.

Medals (2008-2022) (incomplete) 

Ranking by Big (Total result) medals.

African Clubs Weightlifting Championships
Since 2022.

African Junior Weightlifting Championships
Since 1995.

African Youth Weightlifting Championships

 Source : 
 http://iwrp.net/
 http://www.iwf.net/results/results-by-events/
 http://www.iwf.net/results/results-by-events/?event_year=2009

See also

 Weightlifting at the 2007 All-Africa Games
 Weightlifting at the 2015 African Games
 Weightlifting at the 2019 African Games
 Arab Weightlifting Championships

References

External links
Official WFA website

 
Weightlifting competitions
African international sports competitions
Annual sporting events